Myles Conte (4 April 1947 – 12 March 2014) was a South African cricketer. He played thirteen first-class matches for Transvaal between 1972 and 1977.

References

External links
 

1947 births
2014 deaths
South African cricketers
Gauteng cricketers
Cricketers from Johannesburg